Bukkoree Lemdee (born 11 March 2004) is a Thai professional footballer who plays as a centre back for Thai League 1 club Chonburi.

Career
Bukkoree learned to play football in the youth team of Chonburi. It was here that he signed his first professional contract in 2021. The club from Chonburi played in the country's first division, the Thai League. He made his professional debut on March 14, 2021 in the away game at Port. Here he was in the starting line-up. In the 61st minute he was replaced because of an injury against Channarong Promsrikaew.

References

2004 births
Living people
Bukkoree Lemdee
Bukkoree Lemdee
Association football defenders
Bukkoree Lemdee
Bukkoree Lemdee
Bukkoree Lemdee
Bukkoree Lemdee
Bukkoree Lemdee